Kilmez may refer to several places in Russia:

Kilmez (river), a tributary of the Vyatka in Udmurtia and Kirov Oblast
Kilmez, Kirov Oblast, an urban-type settlement in Kilmezsky District of Kirov Oblast
Kilmez, Udmurt Republic, a selo in Kilmezsky Selsoviet of Syumsinsky District of Udmurtia